The African redfinned barb (Enteromius camptacanthus) is a species of ray-finned fish in the genus Enteromius. It is found from the Niger Delta to the Congo Basin.

References

 

African redfinned barb
Taxa named by Pieter Bleeker
African redfinned barb